Cronyism is the spoils system practice of partiality in awarding jobs and other advantages to friends or trusted colleagues, especially in politics and between politicians and supportive organizations. For example, cronyism occurs when appointing "cronies" to positions of authority regardless of their qualifications. This is in contrast to a meritocracy, in which appointments are made based on merit.

Politically, "cronyism" is derogatorily used to imply buying and selling favors, such as votes in legislative bodies, as doing favors to organizations, giving desirable ambassadorships to exotic places, etc. Cronyism is a specific form of favoritism.

Etymology 
The word "crony" first appeared in 17th-century London, according to the Oxford English Dictionary and is believed to be derived from the Greek word chronios (χρόνιος), meaning "long term".

A less likely but oft-quoted source is the supposed Irish term Comh-Roghna, which translates as "close pals", or mutual friends.

Concept 

Government officials are particularly susceptible to accusations of cronyism, as they spend taxpayers' money. Many democratic governments are encouraged to practice administrative transparency in accounting and contracting, however, there often is no clear delineation of when an appointment to government office is "cronyism".

In the private sector, cronyism exists in organizations, often termed "the old boys' club" or "the golden circle"; again, the boundary between cronyism and "networking" is difficult to delineate.

It is not unusual for a politician to surround themself with highly qualified subordinates, and to develop social, business, or political friendships leading to the appointment to office of friends, likewise in granting government contracts. In fact, the counsel of such friends is why the officeholder successfully obtained their powerful position; therefore, cronyism usually is easier to perceive than to demonstrate and prove. Politicians with representatives of business, other special interests, as unions and professional organizations get "crony-business" done in political agreements, especially by "reasonable" and lucrative honorariums to the politician for making speeches, or by legal donations to ones election campaign or to ones political party, etc.

Cronyism describes relationships existing among mutual acquaintances in private organizations where business, business information, and social interaction are exchanged among influential personnel. This is termed crony capitalism, and is an ethical breach of the principles of the market economy; in advanced economies, crony capitalism is a breach of market regulations.

Given crony capitalism's nature, these dishonest business practices are frequently (yet not exclusively) found in societies with ineffective legal systems. Consequently, there is an impetus upon the legislative branch of a government to ensure enforcement of the legal code capable of addressing and redressing private party manipulation of the economy by the involved businessmen and their government cronies.

The economic and social costs of cronyism are paid by society. Those costs are in the form of reduced business opportunity for the majority of the population, reduced competition in the market place, inflated consumer goods prices, decreased economic performance, inefficient business investment cycles, reduced motivation in affected organizations, and the diminution of economically productive activity. A practical cost of cronyism manifests in the poor workmanship of public and private community projects.

Cronyism is self-perpetuating; cronyism then begets a culture of cronyism. This can only be apprehended by a comprehensive, effective, and enforced legal code, with empowered government agencies which can effect prosecutions in the courts.

Some instances of cronyism are readily transparent. With others, it is only in hindsight that the qualifications of the alleged "crony" must be evaluated. All appointments that are suspected of being cronyism are controversial. The appointed party may choose to either suppress disquiet or ignore it, depending upon the society's level of freedom of expression and individual personal liberty.

Examples

An example can be found in political activity in South Carolina, particularly in relation to Governor Henry McMaster, who initially gained his position after becoming the first high-level state official to endorse President Donald Trump and subsequently rose from lieutenant governor to governor of the state when President Trump appointed Nikki Haley to be the United States ambassador to the United Nations in November 2016. On July 9, 2019, Governor McMaster would then go on to attempt to force a vote for the President of the University of South Carolina ahead of schedule and for the benefit of his favorite candidate, Robert Caslen Jr., former superintendent of West Point Academy who was favored by President Trump and previously interviewed by the Trump administration for the position of National Security Advisor. Less than two weeks later, in spite of protestation from a majority of the student body, alumni, and major donors, the vote was cast in favor of Caslen on July 19, 2019.

The Russian president Vladimir Putin is alleged to be the "head of the clan", whose assets are estimated at $200 billion. A list of Russian and Ukrainian politicians associated with "kleptocratic style" has been published by the Kleptocracy Archives project.
 
U.S. President Donald Trump assigned at least five members of his private golf clubs to choice government jobs such as ambassadorships. This is the first time in modern history that a president has rewarded people with jobs that paid money to his own companies.

The nominations of Prime Minister Boris Johnson for the House of Lords were selected based on their support for his version of Brexit, rather than ability or service to the public as is customary (for instance, the previous Speaker of the House of Commons John Bercow did not receive a nomination due to Johnson's perception that he worked against him for getting key Brexit votes through). The process for procurement of government contracts during the COVID-19 pandemic in the United Kingdom has been criticised by some as a "chumocracy" (cronyism).

India: High command culture
In India, it has been seen that the chiefs of national political parties directly appoint their close aides as the regional subordinates rather than through the party's internal elections—thus undermining the autonomy of the state units. The culture was first seen under the premiership of Indira Gandhi, then under her successor Sonia Gandhi, and now under the Bharatiya Janata Party's Modi government. Over the years, several chief ministers of wide range of parties have been appointed likewise. Before the independence of India, Mahatma Gandhi could override most decisions of the Indian National Congress, regardless of his on-paper status in the party.

See also

References

Further reading 
 
 
 [Also in T. G. Andrews and R. Mead (Eds.), Cross Cultural Management, Volume 2 -The Impact of Culture 1: 126–150. Routledge, UK.]

External links 

 "Favoritism, Cronyism, and Nepotism". Markkula Center for Applied Ethics, Santa Clara University.
 SuperNews: Hurricane Katrina - A political flash cartoon about the cronyism surrounding Michael D. Brown and Hurricane Katrina.

Corruption
Political terminology of the United States
Oligarchy
Ethically disputed political practices
Nepotism
Public choice theory
Group processes
Politics of India